The Aguaray-Guazú River is a river of Paraguay. It is a tributary of the Jejuí Guazú River.

See also
List of rivers of Paraguay

References
Rand McNally, The New International Atlas, 1993.
 GEOnet Names Server 

Rivers of Paraguay